Brzeźno  (German Briesen) is a village in the administrative district of Gmina Człuchów, within Człuchów County, Pomeranian Voivodeship, in northern Poland. It is located within the ethnocultural region of Kashubia in the historic region of Pomerania.

The village has a population of 258.

History
Brzeźno was a royal village of the Polish Crown, administratively located in the Człuchów County in the Pomeranian Voivodeship.

During the German occupation of Poland (World War II), several inhabitants of the village were among over 450 Poles massacred by the Germans in the Igielska Valley near Chojnice in October and November 1939 (see Intelligenzaktion).

References

Villages in Człuchów County